Aryl hydrocarbon receptor pseudogene is a protein that in humans is encoded by the LOC100533655 gene.

References 

Human proteins
Pseudogenes